The World Scout Jamboree is a Scouting jamboree of the World Organization of the Scout Movement, typically attended by several tens of thousands of Scouts from around the world, aged 14 to 17.

The first World Scout Jamboree was organized by The Scout Association in London. With exceptions for the World War years and the Iranian Revolution, it has been organized approximately every four years, and in the more recent years has been organised by the World Organization of the Scout Movement (WOSM), in different locations over the world.  At the jamboree, many scouts will swap badges.

In lexicography, "Jamboree" is considered an Americanism that traces back to 1860–65 and refers to a joyful, noisy gathering. The term is believed to originate from the words jabber (rapid, indistinct talk) and shivaree (noisy celebration), with "m" from jam (crowd).

History
While World Scout Jamboree is the expression used by the World Organization of the Scout Movement, other organizations held events called "jamborees" for their members.

The Scouting program became an international success following its founding by Robert Baden-Powell in 1907. With its continuing growth, the founder of the movement saw a need for a gathering of representatives of Scouting from all around the world. The general aim was to foster a worldwide brotherhood, and to help the young Scouts in the movement learn about other peoples and nations by direct interaction with them.

The idea of organizing such periodical international gatherings was originally conveyed to Baden-Powell by the General Chief of the Scouts of Greece, Konstantinos ("Kokos") Melas, during the 1918 international Scout meeting, in England. Captain Melas proposed the gatherings should repeat every four years, in the same way Olympic Games were held in Ancient Greece. The suggestion was accepted with enthusiasm by Baden-Powell, who named the gatherings "Jamborees".

It was in 1920 that the first World Scout Jamboree was realized, held in the Olympia halls in Kensington, London. Symbolically, the Jamboree site bore the name of the birthplace of the Olympic Games, Olympia. 8,000 Scouts from 34 countries attended the event.

Thereafter, a Jamboree has been held every four years. There are two exceptions to this: no Jamboree was held between 1937 and 1947 because of the Second World War, and the 1979 Jamboree, which was to be held in Iran, was cancelled due to the political upheaval in the region at that time. The Jamboree has been held in different countries around the world. The first seven Jamborees were held in Europe. The eighth World Jamboree was held in North America where the tradition of moving the Jamboree among the continents began. As yet, Africa has not hosted a jamboree.

To replace the cancelled event of 1979, the World Scout Committee determined that an alternative celebration, the World Jamboree Year should take place. Several regional camps took place, such as the 12th Australian/4th Asia-Pacific Jamboree, held in Perth, Western Australia, along with countless Join-in-Jamboree activities — designed to allow Scouts from around the world to participate in an activity that thousands of other Scouts around the world were also participating in at the same time. This Join-in programme was reproduced again as part of the Scouting 2007 Centenary celebrations.

The greatest attendance of all Jamborees was in 2019, where over 45,000 members experienced a Jamboree in West Virginia, USA. This number represented the permanent contingent who remained for the entire event. They were joined by hundreds of thousands of visiting Scouts who participated on a day basis.

The first Jamboree was more akin to an exhibition of Scouting, allowing visitors to see how things were done in other parts of the world. The Second Jamboree was conducted on a camp basis and each successive Jamboree has developed on this format where the programme is typically more activity oriented, with plenty of time for Scouts from different nations to interact and learn about each other in less formal ways than an exhibition would allow.

The 16th World Scout Jamboree went to the Southern Hemisphere for the first time, in Sydney, NSW, Australia.

The 21st World Scout Jamboree in 2007 was held in Hylands Park, Essex, United Kingdom, and celebrated the Centenary of Scouting. Because of this, the honour of hosting the event was again bestowed upon the United Kingdom, as the birthplace of Scouting. Over 40,000 young people camped in August at Hylands Park in Chelmsford, Essex. Hundreds of thousands of day visitors attended events in the south-east of England as part of the Jamboree.
The 22nd World Scout Jamboree was at Rinkaby, Sweden from 27 July to 8 August 2011; the 23rd World Scout Jamboree was at Kirara-hama, Yamaguchi City, Japan from 28 July to 8 August 2015; the 24th World Scout Jamboree was at The Summit Bechtel Family National Scout Reserve in West Virginia, United States, from 22 July to 2 August 2019. The next World Scout Jamboree will be held at Saemangeum, South Korea from 2 to 12 August 2023.

Related world-wide events

Jamboree on the Air

Jamboree on the Air, usually referred to as JOTA, is an international Scouting and Guiding activity held annually on the third full weekend in October. The event was first held in conjunction with the fiftieth anniversary of Scouting in 1957, and was devised by radio amateur operator Leslie R. Mitchell who used the callsign G3BHK. It is now considered the largest event organized by the WOSM annually.

Amateur radio operators from all over the world participate with over 500,000 Scouts and Guides to teach them about radio and to assist them to contact their fellow Scouts and Guides by means of amateur radio and since 2004, by the VOIP-based Echolink. Scouts and Guides are also encouraged to send paper or electronic confirmations known as "QSL cards", or "eQSLs" when they are sent electronically. This provides the Scouts and Guides with a means of learning about fellow Scouts and Guides from around the world. It is an adjunct to the World Scout Jamboree.

The event is recognized as one of international participation by the various Scout and Guide organisations, and supports several awards which are a part of Scouting and Guiding programmes.

Jamboree on the Internet

Jamboree on the Internet, known by its acronym JOTI, is an international Scouting activity held annually. Participants, through the use of designated Chats from all over the world, can contact their fellow Scouts by means of the Internet. Common communication methods include ScoutLink (IRC), e-mail, and VOIP. This provides the Scouts with a means of learning about fellow Scouts from around the world. JOTI operates alongside JOTA (Jamboree on the Air) and is an official event of the World Organization of the Scout Movement.

JOTI was pioneered in 1995 by Queanbeyan Rovers whilst one Rover, Norvan Vogt was on a student exchange in the Netherlands, with the home crew in Australia co-ordinated by Brett Sheffield. They connected Putten, Netherlands and Queanbeyan, Australia with dedicated IRC servers. In November 1996 the World Scout Committee, noting that Scouting already had a considerable presence on the Internet, and that there was already an informal and rapidly growing Jamboree on the Internet, decided that JOTI should become an official international Scouting event, and that it should be held on the same weekend as the Jamboree on the Air (JOTA).

2011 saw the first ever 'JOTI Radio' station, a broadcast internet radio station based in the UK to provide entertainment for the JOTI weekend, which had live interviews from Scouts all over the world, the team that lead JOTI Radio are made up of the 'Avon Scout Radio' team, which are a County Active Support Unit for Avon Scouts and provide broadcast radio services within the Scouting Movement worldwide..  JOTI Radio is now part of the annual JOTA/JOTI weekend.

Jamboree on the Trail

Following on the idea of the Join-in events from the World Jamboree Year, Jamboree on the Trail (or JOTT), is a co-ordinated event where Scouts around the world simultaneously participate in local hikes. It takes place on an annual basis on the 2nd Saturday in May.

This type of event allows Scouts to take part in activities at the same time as other Scouts, promoting the idea of the Scouting brotherhood. Participants are awarded a JOTT badge as a recognition of having participated in this worldwide event.

Smaller events
There are up to ten smaller Jamboree (or Jamborette) events held each year around the world. This includes Regional Jamborees, which are held every three years in their areas of the world. Scouts from outside these regions are invited, but attendance is generally lower (for example, the EuroJam 2005 event hosted 10,000 Scouts, mostly from Europe).

National associations, and sub-national groups, also organise a number of events, such as the WINGS event and KIJ, which is organised by a County level body.

List of events

See also
 World Scout Moot
 World Scout Indaba
 World Camp (Guiding)

Notes

References

External links

World Scout Jamboree
 What we do - World Scout Jamboree
 History of the World Scout Jamboree
 8th World Scout Jamboree 1955
 11th World Scout Jamboree 1963
 23rd World Scout Jamboree 2015
 24th World Scout Jamboree 2019
 Vision: 27th World Scout Jamboree 2031 in the Czech Republic
 Svojsik's Dream - 4th World Scout Jamboree bid by Czechoslovakia 
Jamboree on the Air and Jamboree on the Internet
 Jamboree on the Air and Jamboree on the Internet
 ScoutLink's Website
Jamboree on the Trail
 JOTT's main site
 JOTT's UK site

Scouting jamborees
Recurring events established in 1920
 
Quadrennial events